The Queensland cricket team or the Queensland Bulls is the Brisbane-based Queensland representative cricket side in Australia's domestic cricket tournaments:

Sheffield Shield: four-day matches with first-class status, since the 1926–27 season
Marsh One-Day Cup: a one-day (fifty over per side) tournament with List-A status, since its inception in 1969–70
KFC Twenty20 Big Bash: a twenty overs per side tournament from 2005–06 to 2010–11.

History

1824 to 1926/27
The first European settlement in Queensland was a penal colony established at Redcliffe in 1824, which moved to Brisbane the following year. Free settlers first arrived in 1842.

The earliest evidence of cricket being played in Queensland is in 1857, two years prior to separation from New South Wales and statehood. A match between Brisbane and Ipswich was held in 1859 while in 1860 a Toowoomba team played Dalby. By 1862 there were also teams in Warwick, Maryborough, Gayndah, Gympie, Rockhampton and the Lockyer Valley.

Queensland's first inter-colonial (i.e. representative) match was in 1864 when their XXII was beaten by a New South Wales XI. In 1875, Queensland recorded their first victory when their XVIII beat the NSW XI. That victory was a catalyst for the formation of the Queensland Cricket Association in 1876. Queensland was finally granted first-class status in 1892–93, winning its inaugural first-class match against NSW in that season by 14 runs.
Queensland rarely played more than two inter-colonial matches per season from 1892 to 1893, with generally one match (and often both) against New South Wales. The tyranny of distance and non-professional status of the players severely limited opportunities for more first-class competition during this period.

The Sheffield Shield competition commenced in 1892–93 but Queensland's initial applications for admission were refused. Despite their minimal first-class exposure, Queensland still produced four Australian Test players prior to their Sheffield Shield debut, though none played more than six Tests. The first was the colourful Arthur Coningham who played his only Test in 1895. Remarkably, he took a wicket with his very first delivery (it was also the first ball of the Test). He also scored Queensland's initial first-class century, 151 against NSW.

1910–11 was a very successful season as Queensland recorded three first-class wins for the first time, beating NSW home and away and Victoria in Melbourne in their only three games of the summer.

1926/27 to 1963/64
Queensland was finally admitted to the Sheffield Shield in 1926–27 and had a successful debut year, defeating NSW in their first ever Shield match and also eventual winners SA in their only meeting. Like most new teams the side struggled to maintain that level of performance and finished last in the (then) four-team competition 15 times in its first 19 seasons. However the decision to include Queensland quickly paid off with the emergence of regular Test players such as Bill Brown, Don Tallon, Percy Hornibrook and Ron Oxenham. Brisbane hosted its first Test match in 1928–29 when Australia met England at the Exhibition Ground.

By the early 1950s Queensland had a very competitive side and was regularly finishing in the top three of the (now) five team Shield following Western Australia's admission in 1946–47. In 1956–57 they finished an agonising one point behind winners NSW. More Australian players were produced, including Ron Archer, Wally Grout, Ken 'Slasher' Mackay and Peter Burge. Another highlight of this period was the dramatic Tied Test between Australia and the West Indies at the Gabba in 1960–61.

1964/65 to 1972/73
This period was undoubtedly Queensland's worst era, finishing last eight times in nine Shield seasons. Rock bottom was reached in 1967–68 when the side failed to win a single game. The QCA decided to recruit high-profile interstate players to revive the team's fortunes. Greg Chappell was vice-captain of South Australia under brother Ian and was lured north for the 1973–74 season with the promise of the Queensland captaincy. Emerging pace bowler Jeff Thomson followed the next year.

1973/74 to 1993/94
The addition of Chappell and Thomson to a side containing players such as Sam Trimble, Martin Kent, Tony Dell and Geoff Dymock had an immediate impact. Queensland gained four seconds and a third over the next five seasons, as well as winning the domestic one day cup in 1975–76, Queensland's first piece of silverware.

The Queensland teams of the 1980s were even stronger, featuring many outstanding cricketers, both "home-grown" like Craig McDermott, Carl Rackemann and Ian Healy and others attracted from interstate or overseas such as Vivian Richards, Allan Border, Kepler Wessels and Ian Botham. Queensland were runners up five times in seven seasons in the 1980s (including a heartbreaking one wicket loss to NSW in 1984–85), and won the one-day trophy three more times in this period, but that first Shield win was still elusive.

1994/95 to date
The 68-year wait finally came to an end in the 1994–95 season when Stuart Law led Queensland to their inaugural Sheffield Shield win after finishing last the previous year.

Since their breakthrough win, Queensland has enjoyed a golden era winning the competition a further eight times (including three consecutive seasons from 1999–2000 to 2001–02) and also finishing as runners-up seven times. Since Tasmania were admitted in 1977–78, the Bulls have finished in sixth (i.e. last) place just twice.

Colours and mascot

The primary club colour of Queensland Bulls is Maroon, which represents the state colour of Queensland. The secondary club colour is Gold, with additional contrasting colour of white.

The "Bulls" mascot and nickname were adopted at the commencement of the 1993–94 season.

Home grounds
The side plays most of its home games at the Brisbane Cricket Ground, generally referred to as "the Gabba", a contraction of the suburb name of Woolloongabba in which it is located. Matches are occasionally played at Allan Border Field in Albion, Brisbane and Cazaly's Stadium in Cairns. 28 first-class games and two Tests were played at the Exhibition Ground between 1893 and 1931.

Current squad
Players with international caps are listed in bold.

Source(s): Queensland Cricket

Test players

Queensland has produced more than 50 players who have represented Australia in Test matches, while a number of Test players from other countries have played for the team. For a fuller list of players, see Queensland cricketers.

Andy Bichel
Allan Border
Carl Rackemann
Ian Botham
Bill Brown
Peter Burge
Greg Chappell
Tony Dell
Wally Grout
Wes Hall
Ryan Harris
Matthew Hayden
Ian Healy
Graeme Hick
Trevor Hohns
Alec Hurwood
Mitchell Johnson
Michael Kasprowicz
Stuart Law
Ray Lindwall
Martin Love
Colin McCool
Craig McDermott
Ken Mackay
Viv Richards
Greg Ritchie
Andrew Symonds
Don Tallon
Jeff Thomson
Shane Watson
Usman Khawaja
Joe Burns
Matt Renshaw
Marnus Labuschagne
Peter George

Titles

Sheffield Shield
9 titles:
 1994–95
 1996–97
 1999–2000
 2000–01
 2001–02
 2005–06
 2011–12
 2017–18
 2020–21

Domestic One-Day Cup
10 titles:
 1975–76
 1980–81
 1981–82
 1988–89
 1995–96
 1997–98
 2006–07
 2008–09
 2012–13
 2013–14

First-class records

Batting records
Most runs for Queensland

Highest individual score:
 Martin Love 300* vs Victoria in 2003–04
Most centuries:
 Martin Love 28
Most runs in a season:
 Stuart Law 1204 runs in 1990–91
Highest partnership:
 Kepler Wessels and Robbie Kerr 388 vs Victoria in 1982–83
Highest team score:
 900-6d vs Victoria in 2005–06

Bowling records
Most wickets for Queensland

Most wickets in a season:
 Michael Kasprowicz 64 wickets in 1995–96
Most wickets in an innings:
 Peter Allan 10–61 vs Victoria in 1965–66
Most wickets in a match:
 Peter Allan 13–110 vs NSW in 1968–69

See also

Queensland Cricket
List of Queensland first-class cricketers

References

External links
The Homepage of Queensland Cricket
The Homepage of the Brisbane Cricket Ground

Australian first-class cricket teams
Cricket in Queensland
Bulls
Sporting clubs in Brisbane
Cricket clubs established in 1882
1882 establishments in Australia